Palladam Sanjiva Rao (1882–1962) was an Indian flautist and carnatic musician from the state of Tamil Nadu.

Personal life 
Sanjiva Rao was born in 1882 in the town of Palladam near Coimbatore in a Thanjavur Marathi family. Sanjiva Rao learnt music under Shatkala Narasayya and Sirkazhi Narayanaswamy and learnt flute from Sarabha Sastri for seven years.

He was awarded the prestigious title of "Sangita Kalanidhi" for his services to Classical Indian Music by the Music Academy Chennai. His playing is noted for its unique style and the tonality. He also received the Sangeetha Kalasikhamani award bestowed on him by The Indian Fine Arts Society, Chennai in 1943.

References 
  
 http://www.thehindu.com/features/friday-review/music/article65614.ece
 
 

1882 births
1962 deaths
Carnatic instrumentalists
Indian flautists
Venu players
People from Coimbatore district
20th-century Indian musicians
Madhva Brahmins
Sangeetha Kalanidhi recipients
20th-century flautists
Recipients of the Sangeet Natak Akademi Award